Skreened.com is an online retailer of customized and on demand clothing and accessories. Orders are shipped or are picked up in person from their headquarters in Columbus, Ohio.

Business model
Skreened sells American manufactured teeshirts, bags, child and baby apparel. Customers can upload their own image files containing a graphic, logo or text, which will be added to the product by Skreened. Skreened.com also allows the user to have a virtual Skreened "shop" including an online storefront and website hosting, order management, fulfillment, payment processing, and customer service.

History
Skreened was founded as a privately owned company in 2006. As of August 2012, the site hosts over 50,000 online shops  with 300,000 designs.

Corporate Ethics & Giving
Skreened messaging makes frequent reference to ethics or Ethical Apparel. The company only sources garments that do not utilize sweatshop labor and have been manufactured in the United States.

In addition, the company claims that 10% of their profits fund Microcredit through kiva.

Technology
The Skreened brand name which is likely a reference to screen printing technology is a misnomer. The company uses modified inkjet printers in order to produce items cost-effectively in an on-demand marketplace. The process sometimes referred to as Direct-To-Garment (or DTG) is common among print on demand apparel websites.

Awards
 Best New Shop of 2008: Skreened Columbus
 Best of Columbus 2

See also 
 Online shopping
 Self-publishing

References 

 Current Skreened Design Count

External links
 Skreened

Self-publishing online stores
Retail companies established in 2006
Internet properties established in 2006
Online clothing retailers of the United States
Online marketplaces of the United States